Alex Moreno may refer to:

 Alex Moreno (rugby union), born 1973
 Álex Moreno (footballer), born 1993

See also

 Alex Morono